The ICC Men's ODI Team of the Year is an honour awarded each year by the International Cricket Council. It recognizes the top cricket players from around the world in the ODI format of the game. The team does not actually compete, but exists solely as an honorary entity.

ICC Men's ODI Team of Year

Winners
Players marked bold won the ICC Men's ODI Cricketer of the Year in that respective year:

{| class="wikitable"
!Year
!No. 1
!No. 2
!No. 3
!No. 4
!No. 5
!No. 6
!No. 7
!No. 8
!No. 9
!No. 10
!No. 11
!12th man
|-
!2004
| Adam Gilchrist (wk)
| Sachin Tendulkar
| Chris Gayle
| Ricky Ponting (c)
| Brian Lara
| Virender Sehwag
| Jacques Kallis
| Andrew Flintoff
| Shaun Pollock
| Chaminda Vaas
| Jason Gillespie
|
|-
!2005
| Marvan Atapattu (c)
| Adam Gilchrist (wk)
| Rahul Dravid
| Kevin Pietersen
| Inzamam-ul-Haq
| Andrew Flintoff
| Andrew Symonds
| Daniel Vettori
| Brett Lee
| Naved-ul-Hasan
| Glenn McGrath
| Jacques Kallis
|-
!2006
| Adam Gilchrist (wk)
| MS Dhoni
| Ricky Ponting
| Mahela Jayawardene (c)
| Yuvraj Singh
| Michael Hussey
| Andrew Flintoff
| Irfan Pathan
| Brett Lee
| Shane Bond
| Muttiah Muralitharan
| Andrew Symonds
|-
!2007
| Matthew Hayden
| Sachin Tendulkar
| Ricky Ponting (c)
| Kevin Pietersen
| Shivnarine Chanderpaul
| Jacques Kallis
| Mark Boucher (wk)
| Chaminda Vaas
| Shane Bond
| Muttiah Muralitharan
| Glenn McGrath
| Michael Hussey
|-
!2008
| Herschelle Gibbs
| Sachin Tendulkar
| Ricky Ponting (c)
| Younis Khan
| Andrew Symonds
| MS Dhoni (wk)
| Farveez Maharoof
| Daniel Vettori
| Brett Lee
| Mitchell Johnson
| Nathan Bracken
| Salman Butt
|-
!2009
| Virender Sehwag
| Chris Gayle
| Kevin Pietersen
| Tillakaratne Dilshan
| Yuvraj Singh
| Martin Guptill
| MS Dhoni (c/wk)
| Andrew Flintoff
| Nuwan Kulasekara
| Ajantha Mendis
| Umar Gul
| Thilan Thushara
|-
!2010
| Sachin Tendulkar
| Shane Watson
| Michael Hussey
| AB de Villiers
| Paul Collingwood
| Ricky Ponting (c)
| MS Dhoni (wk)
| Daniel Vettori 
| Stuart Broad
| Doug Bollinger
| Ryan Harris
|
|-
!2011
| Tillakaratne Dilshan
| Virender Sehwag
| Kumar Sangakkara
| AB de Villiers
| Shane Watson
| Yuvraj Singh
| MS Dhoni (c/wk)
| Graeme Swann
| Umar Gul
| Dale Steyn
| Zaheer Khan
| Lasith Malinga
|-
!2012
| Gautam Gambhir
| Alastair Cook
| Kumar Sangakkara
| Virat Kohli
| MS Dhoni (c/wk)
| Michael Clarke
| Shahid Afridi
| Morné Morkel
| Steven Finn
| Lasith Malinga
| Saeed Ajmal
| Shane Watson
|-
!2013
| Tillakaratne Dilshan
| Shikhar Dhawan
| Hashim Amla
| Kumar Sangakkara
| AB de Villiers
| MS Dhoni (c/wk)
| Ravindra Jadeja
| Saeed Ajmal
| Mitchell Starc
| James Anderson
| Lasith Malinga
| Mitchell McClenaghan
|-
!2014
| Mohammad Hafeez
| Quinton de Kock
| Virat Kohli
| George Bailey
| AB de Villiers
| MS Dhoni (c/wk)
| Dwayne Bravo
| James Faulkner
| Dale Steyn
| Mohammed Shami
| Ajantha Mendis
| Rohit Sharma
|-
!2015
| Tillakaratne Dilshan
| Hashim Amla
| Kumar Sangakkara (wk)
| AB de Villiers (c)
| Steve Smith
| Ross Taylor
| Trent Boult
| Mohammed Shami
| Mitchell Starc
| Mustafizur Rahman
| Imran Tahir
| Joe Root
|-
!2016
| David Warner
| Quinton de Kock (wk)
| Rohit Sharma
| Virat Kohli (c)
| AB de Villiers
| Jos Buttler
| Mitchell Marsh
| Ravindra Jadeja
| Mitchell Starc
| Kagiso Rabada
| Sunil Narine
| Imran Tahir
|-
!2017
| David Warner
| Rohit Sharma
| Virat Kohli (c)
| Babar Azam
| AB de Villiers
| Quinton de Kock (wk)
| Ben Stokes
| Trent Boult
| Hasan Ali
| Rashid Khan
| Jasprit Bumrah
|
|-
!2018
| Rohit Sharma
| Jonny Bairstow
| Virat Kohli (c)
| Joe Root
| Ross Taylor
| Jos Buttler (wk)
| Ben Stokes
| Mustafizur Rahman
| Rashid Khan
| Kuldeep Yadav
| Jasprit Bumrah
|
|-
!2019
| Rohit Sharma
| Shai Hope
| Virat Kohli (c)
| Babar Azam
| Kane Williamson
| Ben Stokes
| Jos Buttler (wk)
| Mitchell Starc
| Trent Boult
| Mohammed Shami
| Kuldeep Yadav
|
|-
!2021
| Paul Stirling
| Janneman Malan
|<small> Babar Azam(c)</small>
| Fakhar Zaman (cricketer)
| Rassie van der Dussen
| Shakib Al Hasan
| Mushfiqur Rahim(wk)
| Wanindu Hasaranga
| Mustafizur Rahman
| Simi Singh
| Dushmantha Chameera
|
|-
!2022
| Babar Azam(c)
| Travis Head
| Shai Hope
| Shreyas Iyer
| Tom Latham(wk)
| Sikandar Raza
| Mehidy Hasan
| Alzarri Joseph
| Mohammed Siraj
| Trent Boult
| Adam Zampa
|
|}

Superlatives
Appearances by player
Players marked bold are still active in ODI matches and years marked bold''' indicate they won the ICC Men's ODI Cricketer of the Year in that respective year:

Appearances by nation

See also
 ICC Awards
 Sir Garfield Sobers Trophy (Men's Cricketer of the Year)
 ICC Men's Test Team of the Year
 ICC Men's Test Cricketer of the Year
 ICC Men's ODI Cricketer of the Year
 David Shepherd Trophy (Umpire of the Year)
 ICC Women's Cricketer of the Year

References

Lists of One Day International cricketers
One Day International cricketers
International Cricket Council awards and rankings